Timo Pekka Olavi Siitoin (May 20, 1944 in Varkaus, Finland – December 8, 2003 in Vehmaa, Finland) was a Finnish occultist and neo-Nazi.

He was born in Varkaus, Finland. According to Siitoin, he was born to a German military officer and Finnish-Russian woman, but he was adopted after his birth. In his youth he studied at the Theatre Academy of Finland and was a disciple of Finland's best known clairvoyant, . In the 1970s he became a neo-Nazi and founded several organizations. He saw himself as the leader of the Finnish Nazi movement but got at most a few dozen supporters. Siitoin also wrote books and pamphlets about politics and occultism.

In 1977 Siitoin was convicted of inciting the arson of the printing house Kursiivi which printed the Communist newspaper Tiedonantaja and founding an organization forbidden in the 1947 Paris Peace Treaty. He was sentenced to five years and seven months in prison. Siitoin had earlier been fined, while convicted of cruelty to animals and vandalism against the Turku Synagogue. On November 4, 1977, the Finnish Ministry of the Interior closed down four of the organizations he had founded, as neo-Fascist and forbidden by the 1947 Paris Peace Treaty.

In 1996, Siitoin ran for the city council of his town of Naantali and came within few votes of being elected, being the sixth most popular candidate. Siitoin died of cancer in Vehmaa, Finland. He was buried in Hakapelto Cemetery in Naantali.

A documentary film called Sieg Heil Suomi has been made about the Neo-Nazi activities led by Siitoin and Väinö Kuisma.

References

Publications

 Musta Magia I, Turun hengentieteellinen seura, 1974 (Black Magic I) 
 Musta Magia II, Turun hengentieteellinen seura, 1975 (Black Magic II) 
 Työväenluokan tulevaisuus, Turun hengentieteellinen seura, 1975 (Future of the Working Class) 
 Paholaisen Katekismus, Kansallis-mytologinen yhdistys, 1977 (Devil's Catechism) 
 Laillinen laittomuus Suomessa, Kansallis-mytologinen yhdistys, 1979 (Legal Illegality in Finland) 
 Rotu-oppi, Kansallis-mytologinen yhdistys, 1983 (The Race Doctrine) 
 Demokratia vaiko Fasismi?, Kansallis-mytologinen yhdistys, 1984 (Democracy or Fascism) 

Source: Iiro Nordling; Long Shadow of Finland's Fuehrer: Life and legacy of the notorious Finnish occult neo-Nazi Pekka Siitoin. Amazon 2021. ISBN 979-8546175634

External links

English ebook on the subject: Pekka Siitoin; Cold War product, Satanist Neo-Nazi Fuehrer of Finland
 Pekka Siitoin; Cold War product, Satanist Neo-Nazi Fuehrer of Finland

1944 births
2003 deaths
People from Naantali
Finnish fascists
Finnish Satanists
Deaths from cancer in Finland
Finnish anti-communists
Neo-Nazis
Neo-Nazism in Finland
Finnish adoptees
Finnish people of German descent
Finnish people of Russian descent
Satanism and Nazism